Kanyuki is a rural locality (a village) in Dobryansky District, Perm Krai, Russia. The population was 7 as of 2010.

Geography 
Kanyuki is located 90 km northeast of Dobryanka (the district's administrative centre) by road. Tikhaya is the nearest rural locality.

References 

Rural localities in Dobryansky District